Cohesion is the component of shear strength of a rock or soil that is independent of interparticle friction.

In soils, true cohesion is caused by following:
 Electrostatic forces in stiff overconsolidated clays (which may be lost through weathering)
 Cementing by Fe2O3, Ca CO3, Na Cl, etc.

There can also be apparent cohesion. This is caused by:
 Negative capillary pressure (which is lost upon wetting)
 Pore pressure response during undrained loading (which is lost through time)
 Root cohesion (which may be lost through logging or fire of the contributing plants, or through solution)

Typical values of cohesion 
Cohesion (alternatively called the cohesive strength) is typically measured on the basis of Mohr–Coulomb theory.  Some values for rocks and some common soils are listed in the table below.

Apparent cohesion of soil
During critical state flow of soil, the undrained cohesion results from effective stress and critical state friction, not chemical bonds between soil particles. All that small clay mineral particles and chemicals do during steady plastic deformation of soft soil is to cause a pore water suction, which can be measured. When we remould soft soil in a classification test, its strength is [(suction) x (friction)], it remains ductile plastic material with constant "apparent cohesion" while it flows at constant volume, because it is at a constant effective stress, and critical state friction is constant. Critical state soil mechanics analyses the bearing capacity of soft clay on the wet side of critical state in terms of a perfectly plastic material with rapid undrained "apparent" cohesion.

References

 Collins internet-linked dictionary of Geology

See also
 Mohr–Coulomb failure criterion

Soil mechanics